The , abbreviated as  in Japanese or HSBE in English, operates the Kobe-Awaji-Naruto, Nishiseto, and Seto-Chūō expressways and their respective bridges between the islands of Honshu and Shikoku, Japan. It is headquartered in Chūō-ku, Kōbe, Hyōgo Prefecture.

The company was established on October 1, 2005 as a result of the privatization of its predecessor, the Honshu-Shikoku Bridge Authority, itself a successor to the Japan Highway Public Corporation. The company is responsible for maintaining the three expressways and bridge systems between Honshu and Shikoku, as well as the management of the Seto-Ōhashi railway line.

Bridges
 Akashi-Kaikyō Bridge
 Ōnaruto Bridge
 Shimotsui-Seto Bridge
 Hitsuishijima Bridge
 Yoshima Bridge
 Kita Bisan-Seto Bridge
 Shin-Onomichi Bridge
 Innoshima Bridge
 Ikuchi Bridge
 Tatara Bridge
 Ōmishima Bridge
 Hakata-Ōshima Bridge
 Kurushima-Kaikyō Bridge

References

External links 
 HSBE: Honshu-Shikoku Bridge Expressway Company 

Expressway companies of Japan
Companies based in Kobe